The Bolt, Op. 27, is a ballet music score written by Dmitri Shostakovich between 1930 and 1931 to a libretto by . The humorous and satirical full-length ballet in three acts and seven scenes was choreographed by Fyodor Lopukhov and premiered on 8 April 1931 at the State Academic Theatre of Opera and Ballet in Leningrad. It was not performed again until 2005, when a two-act choreography by Alexei Ratmansky was performed at the Bolshoi Theatre in Moscow.

Plot
The ballet is an ironic tale of slovenly work in a Soviet factory. The lazy Lyonka hates work and together with a local priest and anti-Soviet plotter he plans to sabotage the machinery by putting a bolt in it. Their plan is foiled by a group of Young Communists.

Instrumentation
Woodwinds: piccolo, 2 flutes (2nd doubling piccolo), 2 oboes, cor anglais, 2 Bb clarinets, Eb clarinet (doubling bass clarinet), 2 bassoons, double bassoon

Brass: 6 French horns, 3 trumpets, 3 trombones, 1 tuba

Percussion: timpani, triangle, tambourine, snare drums, cymbals, bass drum, gong, glockenspiel, xylophone

Strings: violins, violas, cellos, double basses

Banda in Finale: Eb cornet, 2 Bb cornets, 2 trombones, 8 saxophones (2A,2T,2Bar,2B)

Reception
The premiere was the only performance for 74 years, as the audience jeered it and the critics upbraided it for its un-Soviet intentions. Along with his other ballets The Limpid Stream and The Golden Age, the work was banned by the authorities after Shostakovich's first denunciation in 1936. He subsequently put parts of it in his other music.

The waspish and delightfully colourful score bowls along like a children’s cartoon-film, every number full of drama and parody and fine take-offs of serious and popular music of every kind. Among the highlights are the opening scene when the workers gather in the morning for their physical fitness class before hitting the conveyor belts, the appearance of pompous and opinionated officials and bureaucrats, a ridiculous church-going episode, and the exciting scene when the sabotage-conspiracy nearly succeeds and is only foiled at the last moment. There are also plenty of numbers which mimic the whirling and hammering sounds of modern factory machinery.
 — Gerard McBurney

Suite
Shostakovich extracted a suite from the ballet, Op. 27a, with eight movements:

Overture (Introduction)
The Bureaucrat (Polka)
The Drayman's Dance (Variations)
Kozelkov's Dance with Friends (Tango)
Intermezzo
The Dance of the Colonial Slave-Girl
The Appeaser
General Dance and Apotheosis

References
Notes

Sources
Fay, Laurel E. ed. (2004). Shostakovich and His World. Princeton, NJ: Princeton University Press.

External links
 How Shostakovich's The Bolt Changed ballet history, The Guardian, 31 December 2014

Ballets by Fedor Lopukhov
Ballets by Dmitri Shostakovich
1931 ballet premieres
Ballets by Alexei Ratmansky
Ballet music
Suites by Dmitri Shostakovich